Dede Lovelace is an American actress, skateboarder, visual artist, and DJ. Lovelace made her acting debut in That One Day (2016). Lovelace played Janay in the 2018 film Skate Kitchen, and currently plays Janay in the 2020 HBO television series adaptation Betty.

References

External links 
 

American skateboarders
Female skateboarders
Living people
African-American skateboarders
African-American actresses
Artist skateboarders
Year of birth missing (living people)
21st-century African-American people
21st-century African-American women